Wheelchair tennis events at the 2012 Summer Paralympics were held between 1 and 9 September at Eton Manor, London.

Classification
Players were classified according to the type and extent of their disability. The classification system allowed players to compete against others with a similar level of function. To compete in wheelchair tennis, athletes must have a major or total loss of function in one or both legs. Quadriplegic class players compete in mixed events, while Paraplegic class players (with full use of their arms) competed in separate men's and women's events.

Events
Six events were contested:
Men's singles
Men's doubles
Women's singles
Women's doubles
Quad singles
Quad doubles
(Quadriplegic class players are not divided by gender)

Participating nations
112 competitors from 31 nations took part in this sport.

Medal summary

Medalists

Source: Paralympic.org

Medal table

References

External links
 

 
2012
2012 Summer Paralympics events
Tennis tournaments in England
Summer Paralympics
2012 in English tennis